Fibracat TV  was a Catalan language private TV station based in Manresa, Spain. The channel was run by Fibracat.

The channel was launched on June 1, 2020 after Fibracat, a company dedicated to telephone and internet services, rented the frequency that was used by RAC 105 TV.

The channel's programming consisted of half-hour slots which focus primarily on feminism and new technologies. Therefore, the channel's programs usually deal with issues such as gender equality, women's empowerment, the technological revolution and the social and economic changes generated by these movements.

Fibracat TV ceased activity on the last day of 2022, with no reason for its end of transmission given.

References

External links

Television stations in Spain
Television channels and stations established in 2020
Television channels and stations disestablished in 2022
Catalan-language television stations
Television stations in Catalonia
2020 establishments in Catalonia
2022 disestablishments in Catalonia